Jorge Luis Oña Ugarte (born December 31, 1996) is a Cuban professional baseball outfielder in the San Diego Padres organization.

Career
At the COPABE 18U Pan American Championships 2014, Oña hit .636 with four home runs. In July 2015 he defected from Cuba to pursue a Major League Baseball career in the United States.

Oña signed with the San Diego Padres on July 21, 2016. He began his professional career in 2017 with the Fort Wayne TinCaps of the Class A Midwest League and spent the whole season there, posting a .277 batting average with 11 home runs and 64 RBIs in 107 games. In 2018, he played for the Lake Elsinore Storm where he batted .239 with eight home runs and 44 RBIs in 100 games. He played in only 25 games in 2019 for the Amarillo Sod Poodles, hitting .348/.417/.539/.956 with 5 home runs and 18 RBI, due to suffering a labrum tear in his right shoulder which required surgery.

On November 20, 2019, the Padres added Oña to their 40-man roster.

On September 7, 2020, Oña was promoted to the major leagues and made his debut that day against the Colorado Rockies. In his rookie year, Oña went 3-for-12 with one home run. On May 4, 2021, Oña underwent arthroscopic surgery on his right elbow, putting him out of action for six to eight weeks. On May 9, Oña was placed on the 60-day injured list. Oña did not appear in a major league game in 2021, appearing in just 5 minor league rehab games. He was outrighted off of the 40-man roster following the season on November 19, 2021.

References

External links

1996 births
Living people
Major League Baseball players from Cuba
Cuban expatriate baseball players in the United States
Major League Baseball outfielders
San Diego Padres players
Fort Wayne TinCaps players
Lake Elsinore Storm players
Amarillo Sod Poodles players
San Antonio Missions players